Brent Seabrook (born April 20, 1985) is a Canadian former professional ice hockey defenceman under contract for the Tampa Bay Lightning of the National Hockey League (NHL). He played fifteen seasons for the Chicago Blackhawks, who selected him in the first round, 14th overall, in the 2003 NHL Entry Draft out of the Western Hockey League (WHL). He played four seasons of junior with the Lethbridge Hurricanes before joining the Blackhawks in 2005–06, becoming a key component in their success including three Stanley Cup championships. Internationally, he competed for Team Canada and won gold medals at the 2003 IIHF World U18 Championships, 2005 World Junior Championships and 2010 Winter Olympics in Vancouver.

Playing career

Junior
Growing up in Tsawwassen, British Columbia, Seabrook played minor hockey with the South Delta Minor Hockey Association. He also played spring hockey with the Pacific Vipers, along with three future Chicago Blackhawks teammates, Colin Fraser, Troy Brouwer and Andrew Ladd. He went on to play major junior in the Western Hockey League (WHL) with the Lethbridge Hurricanes, who drafted by him in the first round of the 2000 WHL Bantam Draft. Seabrook played with future Chicago Blackhawks teammate Kris Versteeg for three seasons in Lethbridge. After a 42-point season in 2002–03 with the Hurricanes, Seabrook was drafted 14th overall by the Chicago Blackhawks in the 2003 NHL Entry Draft.

Professional

Chicago Blackhawks
Seabrook made his professional debut after completing his fourth and final WHL season, being assigned to the Norfolk Admirals, the Blackhawks' American Hockey League (AHL) affiliate, for the final three games of the regular season and six post-season games. Seabrook cracked the Blackhawks' line-up his first year out of junior in 2005–06 and recorded five goals and 32 points as a rookie. In his third NHL season, in 2007–08, Seabrook matched his rookie total with 32 points while tallying a personal-best nine goals. He began the season on the top-defensive pairing with Duncan Keith.

The following season, Seabrook became an integral part of a young and rejuvenated Blackhawks team that made the Stanley Cup playoffs for the first time in seven years the following season in 2009. He scored 11 points in 17 post-season games as the Blackhawks made it to the Western Conference Finals, where they were defeated by the Detroit Red Wings. On March 17, 2010, Seabrook was knocked out by a high hit from James Wisniewski, a former teammate.  Seabrook missed the next two games, while Wisniewski was ultimately suspended for eight games. On June 9, 2010, the Blackhawks won the Stanley Cup after defeating the Philadelphia Flyers 4–3 in overtime.

On February 27, 2011, the Blackhawks signed Seabrook to a five-year, $29 million contract extension.

On May 29, 2013, Seabrook scored the Game 7 overtime winner against the Detroit Red Wings in the Western Conference Semi-finals, advancing Chicago to the Western Conference Final. During the Finals, on June 19, Seabrook scored the overtime winner against the Boston Bruins in Game 4 of the series. Seabrook won his second Stanley Cup as the Blackhawks beat the Bruins in six games.

During the first round of the 2014 playoffs, Seabrook delivered a high-hit to David Backes of the St. Louis Blues. Backes was forced to leave the game and Seabrook was assessed a match penalty. The Department of Player Safety reviewed the hit and suspended Seabrook for three games.

On September 17, 2015, the Blackhawks named Seabrook as an alternate captain. On September 26, 2015, the Blackhawks signed Seabrook to an eight-year, $55 million contract extension. Seabrook played in his 1,000th NHL game on March 29, 2018, in a game against the Winnipeg Jets.

On December 11, 2018, Seabrook and teammate Duncan Keith became the first pair of defencemen, and the seventh duo in NHL history to play 1,000 games together.

Injuries and retirement
On December 26, 2019, the Blackhawks placed Seabrook on long-term injured reserve after announcing he would require three separate surgical operations to repair his right shoulder and both hips. Seabrook missed the remainder of the 2019–20 season. He returned to practice with the team in July to prepare for the 2020 Stanley Cup playoffs, which had been postponed to August due to the COVID-19 pandemic. Seabrook opted out of the playoffs on July 24 to focus on fully recovering from his surgery.

Seabrook intended to rejoin the Blackhawks prior to the 2020–21 season, but injured his back days before team's pre-season training camp. He was placed on injured reserve to start the season. On March 5, 2021, Seabrook announced he could no longer continue his playing career in the NHL due to injury. Seabrook intends on formally retiring after his current contract expires after the 2023–24 NHL season. On July 27, 2021, the Blackhawks traded Seabrook's contract to the Tampa Bay Lightning in exchange for Tyler Johnson and a second-round draft pick in 2023.

Seabrook played in 1,114 regular season games over 15 seasons in the NHL, where he recorded 103 goals and 361 assists. Stan Bowman, the Blackhawks' president of hockey operations, reflected on Seabrook's contributions, stating, "Without Brent Seabrook, the Chicago Blackhawks would not have three Stanley Cups. He concludes his career as not only one of the best defensemen in franchise history, but one the greatest Chicago Blackhawks of all time."

International play

During his junior career, Seabrook represented Team Canada in two World Junior Championships. In 2004 in Finland, he recorded three points to help Canada to the gold medal game against the United States, where they were defeated 4–3. Returning the following year in 2005 in the United States, he matched his three-point total from the previous tournament and helped defeat Russia 6–1 in the final to capture Canada's first gold medal that began a five-year run.

After his rookie season with the Blackhawks, Seabrook made his senior international debut with Team Canada at the 2006 World Championships in Latvia, where Canada failed to medal.

On December 30, 2009, Seabrook was called and asked to play for Team Canada at the 2010 Winter Olympics in Vancouver, along with Blackhawks teammates Duncan Keith and Jonathan Toews. He was expected to continue his NHL pairing with Keith during the tournament, but he instead became designated as Canada's seventh defenceman. He notched one assist over seven games as Canada won the gold medal over the United States 3–2 in overtime on February 28, 2010.

Personal life
Seabrook and his wife Dayna have three children: a son and two daughters.

On February 25, 2014, Seabrook, along with Blackhawks teammate Duncan Keith, made a cameo appearance in the episode "Virgin Skin" on the NBC drama Chicago Fire. His younger brother, Keith Seabrook, was drafted by the Washington Capitals and played in the AHL from 2009 to 2012, returning in 2014 after a brief hiatus from the sport.

Career statistics

Regular season and playoffs

International

Awards and honours

References

External links

 

1985 births
Canadian ice hockey defencemen
Chicago Blackhawks draft picks
Chicago Blackhawks players
Ice hockey people from British Columbia
Ice hockey players at the 2010 Winter Olympics
Lethbridge Hurricanes players
Living people
Medalists at the 2010 Winter Olympics
National Hockey League All-Stars
National Hockey League first-round draft picks
Norfolk Admirals players
Olympic gold medalists for Canada
Olympic ice hockey players of Canada
Olympic medalists in ice hockey
People from Richmond, British Columbia
Stanley Cup champions